Zhabar i Epërm (in Albanian) or Gornje Žabare (in Serbian: Горње Жабаре) is a village in the municipality of Mitrovica in the District of Mitrovica, Kosovo. According to the 2011 census, it has 1070 inhabitants.

Demography
In 2011 census, the village had in total 1070  inhabitants, from whom 1069 (99,91 %) were Albanians and one (0,9 %) Bosniak.

Notes

References

Villages in Mitrovica, Kosovo